The Whiting Community School District is a rural public school district headquartered in Whiting, Iowa. It is completely within Monona County, and serves the town of Whiting and the surrounding rural areas.

Randy Collins has been the superintendent since 2016, sharing duties at Akron–Westfield and Lawton–Bronson. He replaced Jeff Thelander at both Whiting and Lawton–Bronson.

Schools
The district operates two schools, both in Whiting:
 Whiting Elementary School
 Whiting Senior High School

Whiting Senior High School

Athletics
The Warriors compete in the Frontier Conference - Nebraska in the following sports:
Volleyball
Football
Basketball
Track and field
Baseball
Softball

See also
List of school districts in Iowa
List of high schools in Iowa

References

External links
 Whiting Community School District

School districts in Iowa
Education in Monona County, Iowa